National Highway 126, commonly referred to as NH 126 is a national highway in India. It is a spur road of National Highway 26.  NH-126 traverses the state of Odisha in India.

Route 
NH 126 connects Barapali, Dhaurakhanda, Panimora, Chichinda and Sohela.

Junctions  

  Terminal near Barapali.
  Terminal near Sohela.

See also 
 List of National Highways in India
 List of National Highways in India by state

References

External links 

 NH 126 on OpenStreetMap

National highways in India
National Highways in Odisha